Zimbabwe is a landlocked country in southern Africa lying north of the Tropic of Capricorn. During summer, the whole country experiences warm temperatures as a result of the sun being directly overhead. It straddles an extensive high inland plateau that drops northwards to the Zambezi valley where the border with Zambia is and similarly drops southwards to the Limpopo valley and the border with South Africa. 
The country has borders with Botswana 813 km, Mozambique 1,231 km, South Africa 225 km, Zambia 797 km and almost meets Namibia at its westernmost point. The highest point is at 2 592m (Mt Inyangani)

Climate 
The climate is markedly varied by altitude with the Eastern Highlands 1878m above sea level being much wetter and cooler. There is a dry season, including a short cool season during the period May to September when the whole country has very little rain. The rainy season is typically a time of heavy rainfall from November to March. The whole country is influenced by the Intertropical Convergence Zone during January. In years when it is poorly defined there is below-average rainfall and a likelihood of serious drought in the country, as happened in 1983 and 1992. When it is well defined rainfall is average or well above average, as in 1981 and 1986. the climate can be categorised into three regions, hot region (lowveld and part of the middleveld), warm region (rest of the middleveld and high veld) and the cool region (Eastern Highlands)

Examples

Terrain 
Much of the country is on a plateau with a higher central plateau (high veld) forming a watershed between the Zambezi and Limpopo river systems. The flattish watershed region is part of an ancient etchplain called the African Surface covers large swathes of the continent. While the African Surface occupy the higher ground, spurs and small interfluves a younger "post-African" surface occupy lower positions with occasional rock domes, koppies and tors protruding rolling or plain landscape. The Limpopo and the lower Zambezi valleys are broad and relatively flat plains. The eastern end of the watershed terminates in a north-south mountain spine, called the Eastern Highlands. The northeast-southwest oriented central uplands have been uplifted in geologically recent times (Late Pliocene or Pleistocene) deviating the watercourse of upper Zambezi River that used to flow into the Limpopo River to the east to its current outlet at the Mozambique Channel. The northeast-southwest upland and watershed follows the axis of an epeirogenic flexure. 

Elevation extremes:
lowest point: junction of the Runde and Save rivers 162 m 
highest point: Mount Nyangani 2,592 m

Natural resources: coal, chromium ore, asbestos, gold, nickel, copper, iron ore, vanadium, lithium, tin, diamond, platinum group metals

Land use:
arable land: 10.49%
permanent crops: 0.31%
other: 89.20% (2011)

Irrigated land: 1,735 km² (2003)

Total renewable water resources: 20 km3 (2011)

Natural hazards: droughts; floods and severe storms are rare

Environment – current issues: deforestation; soil erosion; land degradation; air and water pollution; the black rhinoceros herd – once the largest concentration of the species in the world – has been significantly reduced by poaching; poor mining practices have led to toxic waste and heavy metal pollution

Environment – international agreements:
party to: Biodiversity, Climate Change, Desertification, Endangered Species, Law of the Sea, Ozone Layer Protection
signed, but not ratified: none of the selected agreements

Hydrology:
The country is divided into six drainage basins. The largest are the Zambezi and the Limpopo. Western parts of Matabeleland connect to the Okavango inland drainage basin through the Nata river. Most of southern Mashonaland and adjacent parts of Masvingo drain through the Save river into the Indian Ocean. Two smaller drainage basins cover parts of Manicaland, and drain into the Indian Ocean through Mozambique. These are the Pungwe river to the north and the Buzi river to the south. Sediment transport has been studied for rivers in Zimbabwe using the HBV hydrology transport model.

Main land use type:

 Above 1050 mm/annum with some precipitation in all months of the year Afforestation, fruit, tea, coffee and intensive livestock production.
 750–1000 mm/annum seasonally confined with well-defined dry season Large scale intensive crop and livestock production.
 650–800 mm/annum with regular mid-season dry spells Livestock production with fodder crops. Marginal production of maize, tobacco and cotton.
 450–650 mm/annum with periodic seasonal drought and severe rainy season dry spells. Livestock production and drought resistant crops.
 Too low and erratic for even drought resistant fodder and grain crops. Extensive livestock and/or game ranching.

Extreme points 
This is a list of the extreme points of Zimbabwe, the points that are farther north, south, east or west than any other location.

 Northernmost point – unnamed location on the border with Zambia in the Zambezi river immediately north of the town of Kanyemba, Mashonaland West province
 Easternmost point – unnamed location on the border with Mozambique immediately west of the Mozambican town of Vera, Manicaland province
 Southernmost point – the tripoint with South Africa and Mozambique, Masvingo Province
 Westernmost point – the tripoint with Botswana and Zambia, Matabeleland North province, about 150 meters from the easternmost point of Namibia at what is almost a quadripoint

References

External links

 Soil Maps of Zimbabwe European Digital Archive on the Soil Maps of the world